is a sci-fi role-playing video game released by ZAT-SOFT for various computer platforms in Japan in 1983. It was originally developed on the premise of sequels, but only the first game was released. Planet name "Poibos" is a reference to the god Phoebus from Greek mythology, with simplified spelling for a Japanese audience. Poibos Part 1 is one of the first JRPGs ever created, and the first one in a sci-fi setting.

Plot
The Dark Galactic Emperor invaded the planet Poibos and destroyed almost the entire population. The few survivors were imprisoned on the planet Kurane belonging to Empire. One of them, our main protagonist Jorg, managed to escape. He needs to find the seven surviving Holy Men and try to resurrect Poibos.

Gameplay
Poibos Part 1 is a standard early party RPG with tiled map, turn-based battles and random encounters.

References

NEC PC-6001 games
NEC PC-8001 games
NEC PC-8801 games
NEC PC-9801 games
FM-7 games
Sharp MZ games
Sharp X1 games
1983 video games
Video games developed in Japan
Role-playing video games
Eroge
Japan-exclusive video games